Pavičić is a Croatian surname that may refer to
Daniella Pavicic, Croatian-Canadian singer and songwriter 
Domagoj Pavičić (born 1994), Croatian football midfielder 
Jelena Pavičić Vukičević (born 1975), Croatian politician
Jurica Pavičić (born 1965), Croatian writer, columnist and film critic 
Karen Pavicic (born 1971), Canadian dressage rider
Viktor Pavičić (1898–1943), Croatian military commander

Croatian surnames